Thalera is a genus of moths in the family Geometridae erected by Jacob Hübner in 1823.

Description
Palpi minute and hardly reaching beyond the frons. Antennae of male bipectinate (comb like on both sides) usually to apex. Forewings with vein 3 from near angle of cell. Veins 7, 8, 9 and 10 stalked and vein 11 anastomosing (fusing) with vein 12 and then with vein 10. Hindwings with frenulum absent. The outer margin angled at vein 4. Veins 6 and 7 absent.

Species
Thalera aeruginata Warren, 1893
Thalera chosensis Bryk, 1948
Thalera chlorosaria Graeser, 1890
Thalera fimbrialis Scopoli, 1763 - Sussex emerald
Thalera lacerataria Graeser, 1888
Thalera pistasciaria (Guenée, 1857)
Thalera prouti Thierry-Mieg, 1913
Thalera rubrifimbria Inoue, 1990
Thalera suavis (Swinhoe, 1902)

References

Hemitheini